The Gregg-Crites house, also known as the M. M. Crites house, is an octagon house located in Circleville, Ohio, on Route 23 just south of town. It was built by George Gregg between 1855 and 1856.  It was listed on the National Register of Historic Places in 2021.

Relocation
In the early 2000s the farm on which the house stood was acquired by a developer for a new Wal-Mart Supercenter, and the house was scheduled for demolition.
 
After some concerted and expensive action by the Roundtown Conservancy, the 480 ton house (minus its basement) was moved intact to a new location. In order to move the house, steel beams were inserted into the basement, bolted together on site to make a rigid base, and mounted on a hydraulic mechanism with 96 wheels in sets of four. The site donated for relocation was half a mile away, and the self-adjusting hydraulics were necessary to transport the house over uneven ground. The move took place on February 14–15, 2004, and was successful in avoiding damage to the brickwork and the fragile central staircase.

At its new site, the house was set on a concrete foundation which had been prepared for it. The Roundtown Conservancy plans to restore the building and possibly use it as a museum.

Layout

The house has an impressive circular hall with a central spiral stair. There are five main rooms on the first floor, eight equal bedrooms, and a small room in the lantern.

See also
 List of octagon houses
 National Register of Historic Places listings in Pickaway County, Ohio

References

External links
 Roundtown Conservancy (Official Site), owners of the Octagon House in Circleville, OH
 Octagon House Inventory (Ohio page), by Robert Kline, a retired engineer living in Grand Rapids, MI
 DID YOU EVER SEE A HOUSE MOVING? WELL, I DID! Roundtown Conservancy Newsletter, September 2004
 Forgotten Ohio website, photographs of the interior prior to the move
 Timeline, the official magazine of the Ohio Historical Society, January 1989-December 1990 issue with cover story on octagon houses: scanned version on the Forgotten Ohio website
 Saving the octagon house, article by Lisa R. Hooker on her website

Former houses in Ohio
Octagon houses in Ohio
Houses in Pickaway County, Ohio
National Register of Historic Places in Pickaway County, Ohio
Houses on the National Register of Historic Places in Ohio